Tufnell Park is a London Underground station in Islington, close to its boundary with Camden. It is located in the Tufnell Park neighbourhood. It is on the High Barnet branch of the Northern line, between Archway and Kentish Town stations, and in Travelcard Zone 2.

Station
The station has Passenger Operated Ticket Machines. The ticket office has been closed permanently. The station has two lifts between the street and the platform level, rather than escalators. Upon exiting the lifts, passengers are required to use stairs to reach the trains. The southbound platform lies at a lower level than the northbound.

History
The station was opened on 22 June 1907 by the Charing Cross, Euston & Hampstead Railway. The building was designed by architect Leslie Green and the exterior features glazed terracotta (faïence) tiling, supplied by the Leeds Fireclay Company. Although close to Junction Road railway station on the Tottenham & Hampstead Junction Railway, there was never a physical connection between the two stations.

The station was modernised in 2004 by Tube Lines. Major items of works were the communication systems, a complete retiling and new ceilings throughout. Ticket gates were installed some time later. The station also houses a large industrial ventilation fan as part of London Underground's Cooling the Tube project. The fan runs year round along with fans at other Northern line locations. The station was closed between 8 June 2015 and 4 March 2016 for the replacement of the lifts.

Connections
London Buses routes 4, 134, and 390, and night route N20 serve the station.

See also 
Junction Road, London
Junction Road railway station

References

Gallery 

Northern line stations
Tube stations in the London Borough of Islington
Former Charing Cross, Euston and Hampstead Railway stations
Railway stations in Great Britain opened in 1907
Leslie Green railway stations
London Underground Night Tube stations